The Azerbaijan Province also known as the Tabriz Province was a province of Safavid Iran. The city of Tabriz was the provincial capital and the seat of the Safavid governors.

History 
The Tabriz beylerbeylik was created in the first half of the 16th century. The beylerbeylik included such regions as Maragheh, Urmia, Mahabad, Khoy, Salmas, Marand, Talish (between 1592 and 1610), Arasbar, Sultaniya, Zanjan, etc. The agriculture, cattle breeding, and handicrafts were developed in the Tabriz beylerbeylik. Despite the transfer of the capital of the Safavid state to Qazvin (1555), and later to Isfakhan (1598), the Tabriz beylerbeylik, being from a strategic and socio-economic point of view one of the richest and most important regions of the Safavid state, played a large role in the political and economic life of the country. One fifth of the personnel of the Safavid army (about 11 to 12 thousand people out of 60 000) accounted for the Tabriz beylerbeylik. The most influential Kyzylbash emirs (mainly the heads of the Tekeli and Turkman tribes) were appointed rulers of the Tabriz beylerbeylik. 

In 1531, Ulama Tekeli was the beylerbey. The tekeli tribe, whose head was Ulama, was a branch of the Turkoman Takali tribe and moved to Azerbaijan from Asia Minor. Later, the management of the beylerbeylik passed to the emirs from other Turkman dynasties.  In 1583/84, at the insistence of the emirs from the Shamla and Ustajli clan, the head of the Turkman tribe, Emir Khan, was removed from running the beylerbeylik. This became the cause of bloody clashes between the Kyzylbashs. The Emir Khan was also supported by the Tekels. These events put the Safavid state in a difficult position, which was at war with the Ottoman Empire. As a result, the control of the beylerbeylik again passed to the Turkmans. In 1590–1605, the territory of the Tabriz beylerbeylik was under the control of the Ottoman Empire (with the exception of Talysh, Karadag and Ardabil). During the reign of Shah Abbas I (1587–1629 years of rule), after the release of the beylerbeylik, in 1605, the control again passed to the Turkman emir, Pirbudag Khan.

After the death of Pirbudag Khan, his son Shahbanda Khan became the beylerbey. Shahbende Khan died in 1624/25 during a military campaign in Georgia, and his five-year-old son Pirbudag was appointed as a beylerbey, and a special adviser was entrusted with running the beylerbeylik.

After the death of Nadir Shah (1747), several independent khanates were formed on the territory of the Tabriz beylerbeylik (Tabriz, Urmi, Khoisk, Karadag, etc.).

The list of beylerbeys

See also 
 List of Safavid governors of Erivan

References

Sources 
 
 
 

Provinces of the Safavid dynasty
History of Tabriz
History of West Azerbaijan Province
History of East Azerbaijan Province